Happily Ever After is the second single released from American R&B singer Case's second studio album Personal Conversation. The single reached number 3 on the Billboard R&B chart and number 15 on the Hot 100 chart. The song stayed on the Hot 100 charts for a total of twenty weeks. The music video features a young Beyoncé of Destiny's Child as his love interest.

Charts

Weekly charts

Year-end charts

References

1998 songs
1999 singles
Case (singer) songs
Def Jam Recordings singles
Contemporary R&B ballads
Soul ballads
1990s ballads